Mariam Selim (born 24 October 2002 in Alexandria, Egypt) is an Egyptian rhythmic gymnast.

Personal life 
Mariam Selim was born on October 24, 2002, in Alexandria. She began rhythmic gymnastics at age three because her sister was also a rhythmic gymnast. She can speak Arabic, English, and French.

Career 
Selim competed as a junior in the 2016 African Rhythmic Gymnastics Championships in Walvis Bay where she won five gold medals.

She competed as a senior at the 2018 African Rhythmic Gymnastics Championships in Cairo, and she won gold medals in the team, hoop, ball, and ribbon, and a silver medal in the individual all-around. At the 2018 World Championships, Selim finished 61st in the all-around in the qualification round and the Egyptian team finished 25th. She competed at the 2019 FIG World Challenge Cup in Minsk where she finished 50th in the individual all-around. At the 2019 World Championships, she finished 69th in the all-around and the Egyptian team finished 28th.

At the 2020 African Rhythmic Gymnastics Championships in Sharm el-Sheikh, she won a gold medal in the team event and silver medals in the individual all-around, ribbon, hoop, and clubs.

References 

Egyptian rhythmic gymnasts
Sportspeople from Alexandria
Living people
2002 births